Indigo Tunnel is an abandoned railroad tunnel in Allegany County, Maryland, located about  east of Little Orleans. Built by the Western Maryland Railway (WM) in 1904 as part of its Cumberland Extension project from Hagerstown west to Cumberland along the Potomac River valley, which involved construction of four additional tunnels and 23 bridges, Indigo was the WM's longest tunnel. The new rail line opened in 1906. Trains ran through the tunnel until the rail line was abandoned by the newly formed Chessie System in 1975, in favor of the parallel Baltimore and Ohio railroad line on the opposite side of the Potomac River.

The tunnel was acquired by the National Park Service in 1980 and became part of Chesapeake and Ohio Canal National Historical Park. In 2010, the Park Service identified bat colonies living in the tunnel and closed the tunnel to the public in order to protect the colonies.

The tunnel and adjoining right of way were sold to the State of Maryland to be developed as the Western Maryland Rail Trail (WMRT). The section of WMRT that includes the tunnel opened in 2019, but due to an endangered bat species that inhabits the tunnel, it remains closed to the public. Instead, the WMRT bypasses the tunnel via the C&O Canal and towpath–rail trail connections that were constructed near each of the tunnel's portals.

See also
 Allegheny Highlands Trail of Maryland
 Kessler Tunnel
 Stickpile Tunnel
 Western Maryland Railroad Right-of-Way, Milepost 126 to Milepost 160

References

 Western Maryland Railway Co., Baltimore, MD (1954). "Track Chart: Cumberland to Hagerstown."
 waymarking.com. "Indigo Tunnel." Accessed 2010-12-19.

External links
 Indigo Tunnel photos - WMWestSub.com

Tunnels in Allegany County, Maryland
Railroad tunnels in Maryland
Western Maryland Railway tunnels
Tunnels completed in 1904
1904 establishments in Maryland